Kaimosi Friends Primary School is the oldest formal school in Kenya. The primary school is located in Kaimosi in the Western Province.

History and operations
The school was established in 1903 as the Friends Africa Industrial Mission by the Quaker missionaries of the United States, who left South Africa to spread Quaker mission activities in East Africa.

In 1904, the school became known as the Kaimosi Friends Elementary School and diversified learning programs to include reading, writing, carpentry and dressmaking.

The school caters to both day and boarding students.

See also

 Education in Kenya
 List of boarding schools
 List of Friends schools
 List of schools in Kenya

References 

 

1900s establishments in Kenya
1903 establishments in Africa
1903 establishments in the British Empire
Boarding schools in Kenya
Christian schools in Kenya
Co-educational boarding schools
Education in Western Province (Kenya)
Educational institutions established in 1903
Elementary and primary schools in Kenya
Quaker organizations established in the 20th century
Quaker schools